Han Byoungho (born October 7, 1962) is one of the pioneers of the second generation of picture book artists in Korea. He developed distinctive characters inspired by dokkaebi (mythological spirits) through his book Dokkaebi and the Pumpkin Porridge Seller published in 1992 illustrated in the style of traditional Korean painting. Afterward, Han created a number of picture books featuring varied dokkaebi characters, earning him the nickname “dokkaebi artist.” Moreover, based on deep curiosity and keen observations of nature, he published books about nature awareness such as When You Go to Misan Valley and The Day When Baby Otter Came, building his reputation as a picture book artist spotlighting the wonders of nature and ecology. Han also has a particular interest in antiques and creates diverse works and presents exhibitions on old items. He was nominated as the Korean candidate for the 2014 Hans Christian Andersen Award, frequently referred to as the Nobel Prize for children's literature.

Career 

Han Byoung Ho made his debut as a picture book artist in 1992 with Dokkaebi and the Pumpkin Porridge Seller, depicting Korean mythological spirits, dokkaebi, in the style of traditional Korean painting. In 1997, he received the Art Prize of the Sixth Children's Culture Award for his picture book Dokkaebi’s Magic Club, which was later translated into English, French, Russian, Chinese, and Japanese. In 2002, he was awarded the Grand Prize at the Biennale of Asian Illustrations Japan for Cock-a-doodle-doo Is Scary!, and in 2004, he was awarded the Grand Prize for Korean Creative Illustration for When You Go to Misan Valley. In 2005, Han became the first Korean to receive a Golden Apple at the Biennial of Illustration Bratislava (BIB) for I Wish I Were a Bird, which was published in 2004. The book was selected for the IBBY Honour List in 2006. Han was nominated as the Korean candidate for the Hans Christian Andersen Award in 2014. Beginning with the international exhibition of illustration in 1992, Han has presented his illustrations in exhibitions in countries including Japan, France, and Italy, engaging with readers across the world.

Awards 

 2014     Nominated as the Korean Candidate for the Hans Christian Andersen Award
 2012     Special Award, Hankook Children's Outstanding Children's Book Award – The Day When Baby Otter Came
 2006     IBBY Honour List for Illustration – I Wish I Were a Bird
 2006     The 46th Korean Publishing Culture Awards for Illustration – Dokkaebi and the Pumpkin Porridge Seller
 2005     Golden Apple Award, Biennial of Illustration Bratislava (BIB) – I Wish I Were a Bird
 2004     Grand Prize, Korea Creative Illustration – When You Go to Misan Valley
 2002    Grand Prize, Biennale of Asian Illustrations Japan – Cock-a-doodle-doo Is Scary!
 2002     Outstanding Picture Book Award, The 1st SBS Media Award – What Are the Same?
 1997     Art Prize, The 6th Children's Culture Award – Dokkaebi’s Magic Club

Exhibition 

 2017     Picture Zoo, Nami Island International Children's Book Festival
 2016     Picture Books: Play, Look, Share, Special Exhibition for the Establishment of Wonju as a Creative City
 2014     Dokkaebi Artist, Han Byoungho, Suncheon Picture Book Library
 2010     CJ Picture Book Festival Exhibition
 2009     Guest of Honor Exhibition, Bologna Children's Book Fair
 2005     Korea Picture Books 100, Guest of Honor Exhibition, Frankfurt Book Fair 
 2005     Biennial of Illustrations Bratislava, Slovakia
 2005     Le Immagini della Fantasia 23, Italy
 2004     2nd Solo Exhibition, Different Dreams, Gana Art Space, Korea
 2003     Exhibition Commemorating the 200th Anniversary of the Birth of Hans Christian Andersen, Seoul Arts Center, Korea
 2002     Biennale of Asian Illustrations Japan Exhibition, Tokyo, Japan
 2000     Exhibition of Korean Picture Book Illustrations, Tokyo, Osaka, Japan
 1998     1st Solo Exhibition, Dokkaebi, Design Center, Dongduk Women's University
 1996     Exhibition of Korean Children's Picture Books, France
 1993     Seoul International Picture Book Illustration Exhibition, Seoul Arts Center, Korea
 1992     Tehran International Picture Book Illustration Exhibition, Iran

Works as writer and illustrator 

 2004     I Wish I Were a Bird ISBN  9788952754615
 2001     When You Go to Misan Valley ISBN 9788943304379
 2001     Cock-a-doodle-doo Is Scary!  ISBN 9788989843009

Collaborations with other authors 

 2020     Mother’s Island with Lee Jin (Borim Press) ISBN 9788943313241
 2019     Dokkaebi Who Went to the Forest with Kim Seong-beom (Poom Publishing) ISBN 9791196475321
 2018     Along the Way with Kwon Jeong-saeng (Hanulim Kids) 
 2017     Moonlight Dog with Im Jeong-ja (Munhakdongne) ISBN 9788954646338
 2016     Chi Chi Friends with Shin Dong-yeol (Purun Gamsung) ISBN 9791195861309
 2012     The Day When Baby Otter Came with Kim Yong-an (Sigongsa) ISBN  9788952764034
 2008     Teacher Bu, Chief of the Goblins with Jang Soo-myung (Hollym) ISBN 9788970945415
 2007     Empty House with Lee Sang-gyo (Misegi) ISBN 9788980711826
 2005     Dokkaebi and the Pumpkin Porridge Seller with Lee Sang-gyo (Kookmin Books) ISBN 9788911023813
 2004     There Is No Doubt about It! with Hans Christian Andersen (Gesunamu Publishing House) ISBN 9788989654193
 2004     Glow-in-the-dark Monster with Lee Chun-hee (Language World) ISBN  9788955859393
 2003     Let’s Go to the Mountain with Lee Sang-gwon (Borim Press) ISBN 9788943305185
 1999     The Ox and Dokkaebi with Yi Sang (Darim) ISBN 9788987721187
 1998     Haechi and the Four Monster Brothers with Jeong Ha-seop (Gilbut Kids) ISBN 9788986621426
 1998     Dokkaebi and Santa Claus with Lee Jun-yeon (Samseongdang Publishing) ISBN 9788980198566
 1998     What Are the Same? with Lee Mi-ae (Borim Press) ISBN 9788943306151
 1997     The Man in Search of Good Fortune with Jeong Hae-wang (Borim Press) ISBN  9788943307653
 1996     Dokkaebi’s Magic Club with Jeong Cha-jun (Borim Press) ISBN 9788943303563
 1992     Dokkaebi and the Pumpkin Porridge  Seller with Lee Gyeong-ae (Kookmin Books) ISBN 9788911003167

References 

1962 births
Living people
People from Seoul
South Korean illustrators
Children's book illustrators